Laurent Panifous is a French politician, born 21 December 1976 
in Foix (Ariège). He was elected Deputy for Ariège's 2nd constituency
in the 2022 French legislative election.

Biography
Laurent Panifous was director of an EHPAD (residential aged care).

He was mayor of Le Fossat from 2014 and president of the community of communes Arize-Lèze.

Political Career
During the legislative elections of 2022, he was elected deputy for the second constituency of Ariège on June 19, 2022. Dissident from the Socialist Party, he benefited during the interval between the two rounds from the presidential majority party's call to vote in his favour against Michel Larive, the previous deputy and candidate of the New Ecological and Social People's Union.

He announced that he wants to offer a "responsible opposition" to Emmanuel Macron.

External Links

 His page on the site of the National Assembly
 His entry on the Haute Autorité pour la transparence de la vie publique (High Authority for the Transparency of Public Life)

References

Deputies of the 16th National Assembly of the French Fifth Republic
Living people
1976 births